Stonebridge Lock (No16) is a paired lock on the River Lee Navigation in the London Borough of Haringey, England and is located near Tottenham, London. Like other locks as far as Ponder's End Lock it is large enough to take barges of up to 130 tons. The primary lock has been upgraded to mechanical operation, but the secondary lock is operated manually.

Access to the lock
The lock is situated on the navigation between the Lockwood Reservoir on the Walthamstow side and Tottenham Marshes on the Tottenham side. The lock can be reached on foot only from Marsh Lane behind Northumberland Park railway station.

Pedestrian and cycle access via the towpath which forms part of the Lea Valley Walk

Recreation
Angling is allowed on the River Lee Navigation upstream and downstream of the lock. Information from the River Lea Anglers Club.

References

External links
 London canals- Stonebridge Lock
 Stonebridge Lock - a history

Locks of London
Geography of the London Borough of Haringey
Locks of the Lee Navigation